Diego Banowo Bagus Sadewo (born on 24 November 1991), is an Indonesian professional footballer who plays as a forward for Liga 2 club PSIM Yogyakarta.

Club career

Persita Tangerang
In 2018, Diego signed a year contract with Persita Tangerang. Diego scored 8 goals in the 2018 season, when Persita played in the second division.

Persela Lamongan
He was signed for Persela Lamongan to play in Liga 1 in the 2020 season. Banowo made his league debut on 7 March 2020 in a match against PSIS Semarang at the Surajaya Stadium, Lamongan. This season was suspended on 27 March 2020 due to the COVID-19 pandemic. The season was abandoned and was declared void on 20 January 2021.

PSMS Medan
In 2021, Banowo signed a contract with Indonesian Liga 2 club PSMS Medan.

PSG Pati
In July 2021, Banowo confirmed his transfer to Liga 2 club PSG Pati. He made his league debut on 24 November 2021 in a match against PSIM Yogyakarta at the Manahan Stadium, Surakarta.

Honours

Club
Persita Tangerang
 Liga 2 runner-up: 2019

References

External links
 Diego Banowo at Soccerway
 Diego Banowo at Liga Indonesia

1991 births
Living people
Indonesian footballers
Association football forwards
Persijap Jepara players
PSS Sleman players
People from Surakarta
Sportspeople from Central Java